Herbert Spencer Perry (23 January 1894 – 20 July 1966) was a British sport shooter who competed in the 1924 Summer Olympics. In 1924 he won the gold medal as member of the British team in the team running deer, double shots event.

In the individual running deer, double shots competition he finished 13th. He was educated at Felsted School.

References

External links
profile

1894 births
1966 deaths
British male sport shooters
Running target shooters
Olympic shooters of Great Britain
Shooters at the 1924 Summer Olympics
English Olympic medallists
Olympic gold medallists for Great Britain
Olympic medalists in shooting
Medalists at the 1924 Summer Olympics